Gurdići is a village in the municipality of Olovo, Bosnia and Herzegovina.

Demographics 
According to the 2013 census, its population was 129, with 108 people living in the Olovo part and 21 living in the Sokolac part.

References

Populated places in Olovo